The 2004–05 season saw Scunthorpe United compete in Football League Two where they finished in 2nd position with 80 points, gaining automatic promotion to League One.

Final league table

Results
Scunthorpe United's score comes first

Legend

Football League Two

FA Cup

Football League Cup

Football League Trophy

Squad statistics

References

External links
 Scunthorpe United 2004–05 at Soccerbase.com (select relevant season from dropdown list)

Scunthorpe United F.C. seasons
Scunthorpe United